The Durgam Cheruvu Cable Bridge is an extradosed bridge in Hyderabad, Telangana, India. The bridge is located near Inorbit Mall at Madhapur. The bridge connects Jubilee Hills with Financial District and eases traffic congestion to Madhapur across Durgam Cheruvu. Each pillar it has 13 cables each side.

Background 
The city experienced a boom in traffic due to the increasing number of cars owned, and the Jubilee Hills to Madhapur commute, which historically took 30 minutes, began to take 40–60 minutes. The Government of Telangana then put forward a proposal of a bridge through Durgam Cheruvu to ease traffic in the area and cut down travel time to 10 minutes.

Construction 
According to the original plan, the bridge was supposed to have 3-5 pillars holding the road but due to some environmental concerns, the government was forced to settle for a cable-suspension bridge with 2 pillars holding the cables. Construction tenders were opened in early 2019 and L&T (Larson and Toubro) ended up winning the contract and the construction began on 9 March 2019. 

The bridge was supposed to be completed in April/May 2020 and opening in June 2020. However, due to the COVID-19 Global Pandemic, construction finished in August with opening set to be done by Telangana Minister K. T. Rama Rao and  Minister of State for Home Affairs, Government of India G. Kishan Reddy on 25 September. 

The bridge is the longest cable stayed bridge in Hyderabad.

InOrbit Durgam Cheruvu Marathon
InOrbit Durgam Cheruvu Marathon 2021 was held on 24 January 2021.

As a tourist place
Since its opening Durgam cheruvu bridge has been a major tourist attraction. Many Telugu film scenes were shot in this location.

References 

Buildings and structures in Hyderabad, India
Bridges in Telangana
Cable-stayed bridges in India